Peter Handke: In the Woods, Might Be Late is a 2016 German documentary film directed by . It is about the Austrian writer Peter Handke and his home in Chaville, France. The film was shot over a period of more than three years.

Release
The film premiered at the Locarno International Film Festival in August 2016. It was shown at the Hof International Film Festival on 26 October 2016 before being released in regular German cinemas on 10 November.

Reception
Phillip Haibach wrote in Die Welt: "Corinna Belz can of course not show [Handke] in his actual profession, writing, only in monologue, in remembering the happiness of writing his first book in the then new retreat: 'That's how you inaugurate a house, not with some party.'" Haibach wrote that Belz successfully uses archive footage to avoid that the entire documentary becomes a celebration of a "cult of genius".

References

External links
 Official website 

2016 films
2016 documentary films
Documentary films about writers
German documentary films
2010s German-language films
Peter Handke
2010s German films